Lingua Malabar Tamul or simply Malabar Tamil is a variant of Tamil language promoted by European Missionaries in southern parts of Kerala state like Kollam and Thiruvananthapuram districts before they started promoting Malayalam language among newly converted Christians. Malabar Tamil differs significantly from standard Tamil in its selection of vocabulary. Initially Malabar Tamil was printed using Roman script. Later on, printing using Tamil script became widespread.

Etymology
The word Malabar is derived from the words "mala-bar". Mala in Malayalam means "hill". Bar in Persian/Arabic means "country" or "nation".

Gallery

See also
Thambiran Vanakkam
Printing in Tamil language
Henrique Henriques

References

Dravidian languages
History of Kerala
Tamil dialects